Medina is a common Spanish toponymic surname of Moorish origin. It is also habitational Muslim name.

The surname was derived from several cities and towns of Spain such as Medina del Campo, Medina de Pomar, Medina de Rioseco, Medinaceli, Medina-Sidonia and Medina de las Torres. The use of the term dates back to the Muslim rule of Al Andalus (8th–15th century) and it originates from the Arabic word madīnah (مَدِيْنَة) which means "city". Christian families from these places took it as a surname during the Reconquista and later on. The surname was imported to the Spanish colonies by the conquistadores.  Medina is a common surname among Moriscos and Conversos.

People 
Notable people with the surname include:

 Adonis Medina (born 1996), Dominican baseball player
 Alberto Medina Briseño (born 1983), Mexican footballer
 Alexander Medina Reobasco (born 1978), Uruguayan footballer
 Anabel Medina Garrigues (born 1982), Spanish tennis player
 Ana Medina, Venezuela's ambassador to Poland appointed by the National Assembly
 Ann Medina, American-born Canadian journalist and documentary producer
 Antonio Medina (disambiguation), several people
 Astrid Medina (born 1977), Colombian coffee producer
 Avihu Medina (born 1948), Israeli singer-songwriter
 Benny Medina (born 1958), American music producer, talent manager and record executive
 Biel Medina Piris (born 1980), Spanish footballer
 Carlos Medina, Venezuelan plastic artist
 César Medina Lozado (born 1991), Peruvian footballer
 Chris Medina (born 1983), American singer and American Idol contestant
 Claribel Medina (born 1961), Puerto Rican actress
 Danilo Medina Sánchez (born 1951), Dominican politician and President of the Dominican Republic from 2012 to 2020
 David M. Medina (born 1958), a former Justice of the Texas Supreme Court
 Diego Medina (born 1991), Argentine footballer
 Ernest Medina (1936-2018), US Army captain, commanding officer of the unit responsible for the My Lai Massacre
 Fernando Medina (born 1973), Spanish fencer
 Fernando Medina (politician) (born 1973), Portuguese politician and mayor of Lisbon
 Gabriel Medina (born 1993), Brazilian professional surfer
 Henrique Medina (1901–1988), Portuguese painter
 Humberto Medina (dancer), Cuban dancer
 Humberto Medina (footballer) (1942–2011), Mexican footballer
 Isaías Medina Angarita (1897–1953), Venezuelan soldier and politician, President of Venezuela (1941-1945)
 Iizzwa Medina (born 1982), Honduran table tennis player
 Jaume Medina i Casanovas (born 1949), Catalan philologist, latinist, writer, translator and poet
 John Baptist Medina (1659–1710), artist of Flemish-Spanish origin who worked in England and Scotland
 Jorge Medina (cardinal) (1926–2021), Chilean cardinal of the Catholic Church
 Jorge Medina (1968–2022), Bolivian civil right activist and politician
 José Medina (disambiguation), several people
 Juan Medina (disambiguation), several people
 Julio Medina III (born 1976), Panamanian footballer
 Leonardo Medina Gutiérrez (born 1977), Uruguayan footballer
 Lina Medina (born 1933), Peruvian woman, youngest mother in recorded history
 Luis Medina (disambiguation), several people
 Luiz Carlos Medina (born 1990), Brazilian footballer
 Maria Medina (disambiguation), several people
 Maxine Medina, Filipina actress and beauty pageant titleholder
 Nery Medina Norales (born 1981), Honduran footballer
 Nicolás Medina (born 1982), Argentine footballer
 Nicolás Esteban Medina Ríos (born 1987), Chilean footballer
 Ninrrol Medina Torres (born 1976), Honduran footballer and football manager
 Ofelia Medina (born 1950), Mexican actress
 Pablo Medina (born 1960), Cuban poet
 Pablo Medina Velázquez ( 1961–2014), Paraguayan journalist
 Patricia Medina (1919–2012), English actress
 Paula Medina (born 1989), Colombian table tennis player
 Pol Medina, Jr. (born 1960), Filipino comics artist
 Rafael Medina Rodríguez (born 1979), Mexican professional footballer
 Rafael Medina (baseball) (born 1975), Panamanian former Major League Baseball pitcher
 Ricardo Medina, Jr. (born 1979), American actor
 Roberto Medina (born 1947), Brazilian businessman
 Rubem Medina (born 1942), Brazilian politician, economist, and businessman
 Salvador Medina Cárcamo (born 1988), Mexican footballer
 Salvadora Medina Onrubia (1894-1972), Argentine poet, anarchist, feminist
 Samuel Doria Medina (born 1958), Bolivian politician
 Stefan Medina Ramírez (born 1992), Colombian footballer
 Tony Medina (José Antonio Medina) (died 2011), Cuban songwriter
 Tulia Angela Medina (born 1983), Colombian weightlifter
 Vincent Medina (born 1986), Indigenous Ohlone cultural leader
 Wilder Medina Tamayo (born 1981), Colombian footballer
 Yoervis Medina (born 1988), Venezuelan Major League Baseball pitcher
 Yojer Medina (born 1973), Venezuelan shot putter and discus thrower

See also 

 De Medina

Spanish-language surnames